Việt Linh (b. Nguyễn Việt Linh in Saigon, French Indochina (now southern Vietnam), 1952)photo is a prominent Vietnamese film director. She currently lives and works in Paris, France. Her films have been shown in Vietnam, France, the United States and Australia.

She started working in cinema at the beginning of 1971.  Between 1980 and 1985, she studied at the VGIK in the former Soviet Union, graduating in 1985. She then began working for Vietnam's state-owned Giải Phóng Film Studio in Ho Chi Minh City. She has completed seven feature films since 1986 and is currently involved in editing books about cinema for Vietnamese readers. Her 1999 film, The Building, was entered into the 21st Moscow International Film Festival.

Filmography
Nơi bình yên chim hót (1986)
Phiên tòa cần chánh án (1987)
Gánh xiếc rong (1988)
Dấu ấn của quỷ  (1992)
Chung cư (1999)
Mê Thảo, Thời Vang Bóng (The Glorious Time in Me Thao Hamlet, 2002)

See also
Cinema of Vietnam

References

External links
 https://www.imdb.com/name/nm0896858/?ref_=tt_ov_dr
Việt Linh biography and filmography
Article about Việt Linh
Article about Mê Thảo, Thời Vang Bóng
Article about Mê Thảo, Thời Vang Bóng

1952 births
Living people
Gerasimov Institute of Cinematography alumni
People from Ho Chi Minh City
Vietnamese film directors
Vietnamese women film directors
Vietnamese expatriates in France
Vietnamese expatriates in the Soviet Union
21st-century Vietnamese women